Blackstones Bar is a bar located on Pine St off Longfellow Square in the West End (Portland, Maine) neighborhood of Portland, Maine. From its establishment in 1987, the bar served as a popular gathering place for members of the LGBTQ community.

When established in 1987, Blackstones' facade featured seven floor-to-ceiling plate glass windows. These windows suffered consistent vandalism through 1991, when staff boarded them over. In 2019, the plywood sheaths were removed and new windows installed. The event was heralded as a significant milestone for the city of Portland and the local LGBTQ movement, with the story reported in several national newspapers, and featured in several national LGBTQ publications.

References

LGBT drinking establishments in the United States
West End (Portland, Maine)
1987 establishments in Maine
LGBT in Maine
Restaurants in Portland, Maine